Jurua monachina is a species of beetle in the family Cerambycidae, and the only species in the genus Jurua. It was described by White in 1855.

References

Anisocerini
Beetles described in 1855
Monotypic beetle genera